Sari Nasirlu (also Romanized as Sārī Naşīrlū; also known as Āngūrtlār-e ‘Olyā) is a village in Ojarud-e Shomali Rural District, in the Central District of Germi County, Ardabil Province, Iran. At the 2006 census, its population was 264, in 40 families.

References 

Towns and villages in Germi County